Pinacate may refer to:

 Pinacate beetle also known as the stink beetle or acrobat beetle
 Pinacate, California, small settlement on the Santa Fe Railroad
 Pinacate Mining District in Riverside County, California
 Pinacate Peaks are volcanic peaks in northwest Mexico
 El Pinacate y Gran Desierto de Altar Biosphere Reserve, Mexican biosphere reserve including the Pinacate Peaks